Akshat Chopra is an Indian film actor, model, and dancer, who was one of 36 children awarded the National Child Award in 2007 for exceptional achievement in their fields. Presently, he is an elected member of the executive committee of the Public Relations Society of India, Delhi.

Career 
Akshat Chopra, made his acting debut as a child artist in the 2005 BBC documentary film One Night in Bhopal. He then played a role of Vashisht Walia in 2008 film Thoda Pyaar Thoda Magic, and also dubbed the voice of Saleem in Slumdog Millionaire.

Filmography

Films

Short films 
Journey to Hope
Bharosa
Badte Kadam
Jivancharya mein Sudhar layein

Television
Galli Galli Sim Sim
Jasoos Vijay (Doordarshan)
Atmajaa
Jang Lagi Talwar
Dishayein
Khel Khel mein Badlo Duniya
Abhivyakti
Yein Hawayein
Kaka Nikki Time
Rin Mera Star (Dance reality show)

Awards and honours 
Chopra was awarded the Kala Ratan and Bal Pratibha Samaan. He has also been honoured as a guest at the function held at Tihar Jail, and as chief guest at Zee TV's Suncity World School. Chopra also appeared in a show, Little Prince and Princess, organised by Diyadeep NGO and made a special guest appearance at Beti Bhi Apni hai walkathon on World Population Day, organised by Smile Foundation.  He is an ambassador of non-governmental organization Swashrit Society, and has also been a part of Sahara India Pariwar's Ek Vote Kare Chot campaign.

References

External links 

Indian male television actors
Living people
Year of birth missing (living people)